Henry Bunbury may refer to:

Sir Henry Bunbury, 3rd Baronet (1676–1733), British MP for Chester, Commissioner of the Revenue for Ireland
Henry Bunbury (caricaturist) (1750–1811), British caricaturist
Sir Henry Bunbury, 7th Baronet (1778–1860), his son, British lieutenant-general, MP for Suffolk
Henry William St Pierre Bunbury (1812–1875), British soldier and Australian explorer
Sir Henry Bunbury (civil servant) (1876–1968), British civil servant

See also
Bunbury (disambiguation)